A glass electrode is a type of ion-selective electrode made of a doped glass membrane that is sensitive to a specific ion. The most common application of ion-selective glass electrodes is for the measurement of pH.  The pH electrode is an example of a glass electrode that is sensitive to hydrogen ions.   Glass electrodes play an important part in the instrumentation for chemical analysis and physicochemical studies.  The voltage of the glass electrode, relative to some reference value, is sensitive to changes in the activity of a certain type of ions.

History 

The first studies of glass electrodes (GE) found different sensitivities of different glasses to change the medium's acidity (pH), due to the effects of the alkali metal ions.

In 1906,  M. Cremer, the father of Erika Cremer, determined that the electric potential that arises between parts of the fluid, located on opposite sides of the glass membrane is proportional to the concentration of acid (hydrogen ion concentration).

In 1909,  S. P. L. Sørensen introduced the concept of pH, and in the same year F. Haber and Z. Klemensiewicz reported results of their research on the glass electrode in The Society of Chemistry in Karlsruhe. 
In 1922, W. S. Hughes showed that the alkali-silicate GE are similar to hydrogen electrodes, reversible concerning H+.

In 1925,  P.M. Tookey Kerridge developed the first glass electrode for analysis of blood samples and highlighted some of the practical problems with the equipment such as the high resistance of glass (50–150 MΩ). During her PhD, Kerridge developed the miniature glass electrode, maximizing the surface area of the tool by heat treating the platinum with platinum chloride at red heat, thus enabling a much larger signal; her design was the predecessor of many of the glass electrodes used today.

Applications 
Glass electrodes are commonly used for pH measurements. There are also specialized ion sensitive glass electrodes used for the determination of the concentration of lithium, sodium, ammonium, and other ions.

Glass electrodes have been utilized in a wide range of applications including pure research, control of industrial processes, analysis of foods and cosmetics, measurement of environmental indicators, and microelectrode measurements such as cell membrane electrical potential and soil acidity.

Types 

Almost all commercial electrodes respond to single-charged ions, like H+, Na+, Ag+. The most common glass electrode is the pH-electrode. Only a few chalcogenide glass electrodes are sensitive to double-charged ions, like Pb2+, Cd2+ and some others.

There are two main glass-forming systems: silicate matrix based on a molecular network of silicon dioxide (SiO2) with additions of other metal oxides, such as Na, K, Li, Al, B, Ca, etc. and chalcogenide matrix based on a molecular network of AsS, AsSe, AsTe.

Interfering ions 

Because of the ion-exchange nature of the glass membrane, it is possible for some other ions to concurrently interact with ion-exchange centres of the glass and distort the linear dependence of the measured electrode potential on pH or other electrode functions. In some cases, it is possible to change the electrode function from one ion to another. For example, some silicate pPNAelectrodes can be changed to pAg function by soaking in a silver salt solution.

Interference effects are commonly described by the semiempirical Nicolsky-Shultz-Eisenman equation (also known as Nikolsky-Shultz-Eisenman equation), an extension to the Nernst equation. It is given by

where E is the emf, E0 the standard electrode potential, z the ionic valency including the sign, a the activity, i the ion of interest, j the interfering ions and kij is the selectivity coefficient. The smaller the selectivity coefficient, the less is the interference by j.

To see the interfering effect of Na+ to a pH-electrode:

Range of a pH glass electrode 

The pH range at constant concentration can be divided into 3 parts:

 Complete realization of general electrode function, where potential depends linearly on pH, realizing an ion-selective electrode for hydronium.

where F is Faraday's constant (see Nernst equation).
 Alkali error range - at low concentration of hydrogen ions (high values of pH) contributions of interfering alkali metals (like Li, Na, K) are comparable with one of the hydrogen ions. In this situation dependence of the potential on pH become non-linear.
The effect is usually noticeable at pH > 12, and at concentrations of lithium or sodium ions of 0.1  moles per litre or more. Potassium ions usually cause less error than sodium ions.
 Acidic error range – at a very high concentration of hydrogen ions (low values of pH) the dependence of the electrode on pH becomes non-linear and the influence of the anions in the solution also becomes noticeable. These effects usually become noticeable at pH < -1.

Specialized electrodes exist for working in extreme pH ranges.

Construction

A typical modern pH probe is a combination electrode, which combines both the glass and reference electrodes into one body. The combination electrode consists of the following parts (see the drawing):

 a sensing part of electrode, a bulb made from a specific glass
 internal electrode, usually silver chloride electrode or calomel electrode
 internal solution, usually a pH=7 buffered solution of 0.1 mol/L KCl for pH electrodes or 0.1 mol/L MCl for pM electrodes
 when using the silver chloride electrode, a small amount of AgCl can precipitate inside the glass electrode
 reference electrode, usually the same type as 2
 reference internal solution, usually 3.0 mol/L KCl
 junction with studied solution, usually made from ceramics or capillary with asbestos or quartz fiber.
 body of electrode, made from non-conductive glass or plastics.

The bottom of apH electrode balloons out into a round thin glass bulb.  The pH electrode is best thought of as a tube within a tube.  The inner tube contains an unchanging 1×10−7 mol/L HCl solution.  Also inside the inner tube is the cathode terminus of the reference probe.  The anodic terminus wraps itself around the outside of the inner tube and ends with the same sort of reference probe as was on the inside of the inner tube.  It is filled with a reference solution of KCl and has contact with the solution on the outside of the pH probe by way of a porous plug that serves as a salt bridge.

Galvanic cell schematic representation
This section describes the functioning of two distinct types of electrodes as one unit which combines both the glass electrode and the reference electrode into one body. It deserves some explanation.

This device is essentially a galvanic cell that can be schematically represented as:

Glass electrode || Reference Solution || Test Solution || Glass electrode
Ag(s) | AgCl(s) | KCl(aq) || 1×10−7M H+ solution || glass membrane || Test Solution ||  junction || KCl(aq) | AgCl(s) | Ag(s)

In this schematic representation of the galvanic cell, one will note the  symmetry between the left and the right members as seen from the center of the row occupied by the "Test Solution" (the solution whose pH must be measured). In other words, the glass membrane and the ceramic junction occupies both the same relative place in each respective electrode (indicative (sensing) electrode or reference electrode). The double "pipe symbol" (||) indicates a diffusive barrier that prevents (glass membrane), or slowing down (ceramic junction), the mixing of the different solutions. By using the same electrodes on the left and right, any potentials generated at the interfaces cancel each other (in principle), resulting in the system voltage being dependent only on the interaction of the glass membrane and the test solution.

The measuring part of the electrode, the glass bulb on the bottom, is coated both inside and out with a ~10 nm layer of a hydrated gel.  These two layers are separated by a layer of dry glass.  The silica glass structure (that is, the conformation of its atomic structure) is shaped so that it allows Na+ ions some mobility.  The metal cations (Na+) in the hydrated gel diffuse out of the glass and into solution while H+ from solution can diffuse into the hydrated gel.  It is the hydrated gel which makes the pH electrode an ion-selective electrode.

H+ does not cross through the glass membrane of the pH electrode, it is the Na+ which crosses and leads to a change in free energy.  When an ion diffuses from a region of activity to another region of activity, there is a free energy change and this is what the pH meter actually measures.  The hydrated gel membrane is connected by Na+ transport and thus the concentration of H+ on the outside of the membrane is 'relayed' to the inside of the membrane by Na+.

All glass pH electrodes have extremely high electric resistance from 50 to 500 MΩ. Therefore, the glass electrode can be used only with a high input-impedance measuring device like a pH meter, or, more generically, a high input-impedance voltmeter which is called an electrometer.

Limitations
The glass electrode has some inherent limitations due to the nature of its construction. Acid and alkaline errors are discussed above. An important limitation results from the existence of asymmetry potentials that are present at glass/liquid interfaces. The existence of these phenomena means that glass electrodes must always be calibrated before use; a common method of calibration involves the use of standard buffer solutions. Also, there is a slow deterioration due to diffusion into and out of the internal solution. These effects are masked when the electrode is calibrated against buffer solutions but deviations from ideal response are easily observed by means of a Gran plot. Typically, the slope of the electrode response decreases over a period of months.

Storage
Between measurements any glass and membrane electrodes should be kept in a solution of its own ion.  It is necessary to prevent the glass membrane from drying out because the performance is dependent on the existence of a hydrated layer, which forms slowly.

See also

 Potentiometry
 Ion-selective electrodes
 ISFET pH electrode
 Chalcogenide glass
 Quinhydrone electrode
 Solid State Electrode

References

E. P. Nikol'skii, M. M. Schul'tz, et al., Vestn. Leningr. Univ., Ser. Fiz. i Khim., 18, No. 4, 73-186 (1963) (This series of articles summarizes Russian work on the effect of varying the glass composition on electrode properties and chemical stability of a great 
variety of glasses)

External links
 pH electrode practical/theoretical information
 Titration with the glass electrode and pH calculation - freeware

Electrodes
Glass applications